Syntypistis ambigua is a species of moth of the family Notodontidae first described by Alexander Schintlmeister and Cheng-Lai Fang in 2001. It is found in China (Hubei, Hunan, Guangxi, Sichuan) and northern Vietnam.

References

Moths described in 2001
Notodontidae